The Technology for Improved Learning Outcomes (TILO) program works in nine (9) governorates across Egypt to improve the quality of teaching and learning through the use of technology in schools.

The U.S. Agency for International Development and the TILO team are working closely with the Ministry of Education, the Ministry of Communication and Information Technology and private sector partners to develop scalable models to integrate the use of education technology into school based reform activities in ways that improve student learning outcomes.

Schools
TILO works in two different types of schools:

 85 experimental prep schools that are transformed into TILO Smart Schools (TSS schools) in seven governorates
 192 primary and preparatory schools undergoing school based reform (SBR schools) in seven governorates

TILO TSS Schools

TILO SBR Idaras

Alexandria	Montaza (30)
Beni Suef	El Nasr (30)
El Wasta (24)
Fayoum	Tameya (14)
Minya	Beni Mazar (24)
Matay (20)
Aswan	Nasr (28)
Qena
Helwan

Naga Hamedy (18)
(4)

Philosophy
The TILO project is guided by an inter-ministerial Steering Committee and works in the following areas:
Improving the quality of teaching and learning through technology
Builds capacity and demand at schools by working with schools that are committed to school reform and ready to take action
Provides a basic technology package to each participating school
Provides intensive training and support for teachers, senior teachers, supervisors and administrators in the use of technology as a tool for effective pedagogical practice
Provides training and support for subject matter experts and others making decisions at the Ministry level
Introduces a Digital Resource package that includes proven open-source software, tutorials, activities and applications that are linked directly to the Egyptian curriculum
Developing public private partnerships
Builds partnerships to increase the basic technology infrastructure, training and digital resources at schools
Builds partnerships to foster best practice and innovation
Builds partnerships with local businesses and communities to sustain and extend the use of technology for learning
Building capacity for effective management of education technology
Works with the Ministry of Education to develop systems of training and technology management that can be scaled and sustained
Measuring impact
Monitors and evaluates project inputs and outcomes using seven TILO Monitoring and Evaluation Tools
Measures impact using SCOPE and CAPS
Captures baseline and post-training video clips in schools to build capacity and observe change

Education in Egypt